Don't Ask is an album by jazz saxophonist Sonny Rollins, released on the Milestone label in 1979, featuring performances by Rollins with Mark Soskin, Larry Coryell, Jerome Harris, Al Foster, and Bill Summers.

Reception

The Allmusic review by Scott Yanow states: "A bit erratic, this album is still worth acquiring for its stronger moments."

Track listing
All compositions by Sonny Rollins except as indicated
 "Harlem Boys" - 7:06
 "The File" (Larry Coryell) - 4:14
 "Disco Monk" - 7:45
 "My Ideal" (Newell Chase, Leo Robin, Richard A. Whiting) - 3:41
 "Don't Ask" - 4:27
 "Tai-Chi" - 4:49
 "And Then My Love I Found You" - 6:14
Recorded at Fantasy Studios, Berkeley, CA, on May 15–18, 1979

Personnel
Sonny Rollins  – tenor saxophone, lyricon, piano
Mark Soskin – piano, electric piano, synthesizer (tracks 1, 3 & 5-7)
Larry Coryell – electric guitar (tracks 2-5 & 7)
Jerome Harris – electric bass (tracks 1, 3 & 5-7)
Al Foster – drums (tracks 1, 3 & 5-7)
Bill Summers – congas, percussion (tracks 1, 3 & 5-7)

References

1979 albums
Milestone Records albums
Sonny Rollins albums
Albums produced by Orrin Keepnews